Interstate 170 (I-170), also known as the Inner Belt Expressway, is an  north–south auxiliary Interstate Highway in Greater St. Louis, Missouri. I-170 connects to I-270 at its northern terminus and I-64 at its southern terminus. I-170 crosses its parent, I-70, near St. Louis Lambert International Airport.

Route description

History
I-170 was originally intended to provide an inner beltway within I-270 through St. Louis County extending to I-55 in the southern part of the county, commonly called South County; however, the portion of the route south of I-64/US Route 40 (US 40) was canceled due to local opposition. The portion of MetroLink's Cross County Extension south of I-64 runs roughly along the proposed alignment.

The southern portion of I-170 was built using St. Louis County funds in the 1960s through a shallow valley. It was signed as Route 725.

Recent construction
The southern two interchanges on I-170 (at I-64/US 40 and Galleria Parkway) were reconstructed as part of the first phase of the New I-64 project. Most notably, the new interchange includes direct access to I-170 from eastbound I-64; however, access to Galleria Parkway from northbound I-170 was eliminated. Eager Road access to and from I-170 was also revised in the New I-64 project.

Southern extension
Because I-170 terminates at I-64/US 40, a direct access from I-170 and I-64 (US 40) to I-55, I-270, and I-44 are lacked. Also, towns such as Richmond Heights, Brentwood, Maplewood, and Marlbourough lack access to the Interstates, St. Louis Lambert International Airport, South County, and to each other. Because of this, commuters either have to take indirect surface streets as bypasses, such as Hanley Road or River Des Peres Boulevard, which would result in a much higher mileage and time due to traffic signals and a longer route. This also results in higher traffic in residential streets and towns such as Shrewsbury. Proposals had been made to solve this problem, such as a new freeway for faster commute or "South County Connector" to connect Richmond Heights to South County, but these proposals had been postponed due to lack of funding.

Exit list

References

External links

 Kurumi.com: Interstate 170

1
70-1
70-1
Transportation in St. Louis County, Missouri